Jafarabad (also Romanized as Ja‘farābād) is a village in Dizaj Rural District, in the Central District of Khoy County, West Azerbaijan Province, Iran. At the 2006 census, its population was 21, in 10 families.

References 

Populated places in Khoy County